High Valley is the second studio album by Canadian country music group High Valley. It was released on September 14, 2010 by Open Road Recordings in Canada and by Centricity Music in the United States. Included are the singles "I Will Stand by You," "On the Combine," "A Father's Love (The Only Way He Knew How)" and "Call Me Old Fashioned." "A Father's Love (The Only Way He Knew How)" was originally recorded by Bucky Covington on his 2010 EP, I'm Alright, and released as a single in March 2010. The Judds released a cover of "I Will Stand by You" in October 2010.

High Valley was nominated for Country Album of the Year at the 2012 Juno Awards.

Track listing

Personnel

High Valley
Brad Rempel - vocals
Bryan Rempel - vocals
Curtis Rempel - vocals

Additional musicians

Tim Akers - piano
Steve Brewster - drums
J.T. Corenflos - electric guitar
Chad Cromwell - drums
Dan Dugmore - dobro, lap steel guitar, pedal steel guitar
The Eaglemont Family Singers - choir, handclapping, stomping
Shannon Forrest - drums

Kenny Greenberg - electric guitar
John "Chank" Jeansonne - harmonica
Mike Johnson - pedal steel guitar
Steve King - Hammond B-3 organ, piano, synthesizer
Pat McGrath - acoustic guitar
Justin Meeks - drums
Sean Neff - cowbell, acoustic guitar, electric guitar, percussion, synthesizer strings

Michael Rhodes - bass guitar
Ben Shive - Hammond B-3 organ, piano, Wurlitzer
Adam Shoenfeld - electric guitar
Jimmie Lee Sloas - bass guitar
Ilya Toshinsky - banjo, acoustic guitar, mandolin
Travis Toy - banjo, pedal steel guitar
Wanda Vick - fiddle, mandolin
Jonathan Yudkin - banjo, mandolin

Chart performance

Singles

References

External links
[ High Valley] at Allmusic

2010 albums
High Valley albums
Centricity Music albums
Open Road Recordings albums